Two for the Lions is a 1998 historical mystery crime novel by Lindsey Davis and the 10th book of the Marcus Didius Falco Mysteries series. Set in Rome and Tripolitania between December AD 73 and May AD 74, during the reign of Emperor Vespasian, the novel stars Marcus Didius Falco, informer and imperial agent. The title refers to the execution of criminals in the arena, by trained lions.

Plot summary

As part of his attempts to earn enough money to buy himself into the upper middle ranks, and thus make his relationship with Helena Justina respectable, Marcus Didius Falco has offered his services to Vespasian as a tax collector during the 'great Census' of AD 73. Unfortunately, his plan has several flaws, one major one being his need to take on Anacrites as a partner.

Whilst conducting the audit of two gladiatorial training schools, Falco stumbles upon the apparent murder of a star man-eating lion and an apparent rivalry between the schools. When a gladiator also ends up dead, Falco takes on the investigation, one which leads him to Tripolitania.

To add to the confusion, Helena's younger brother, Camillus Justinus, has eloped with the betrothed of his older brother, Aelianus. They too have made their way to North Africa, drawn by Justinus' quest to find Silphium, an expensive herb already deemed extinct.

Major themes
 The 'great Census' of AD 73,
 The elopement of Camillus Justinus and Claudia Rufina,
 The investigation into the rivalry between gladiatorial trainers,
 Developing relationship of Marcus Didius Falco and Helena Justina.

Characters in Two for the Lions

Friends 
 Anacrites - Imperial spy and partner of Falco
 Camillus Aelianus - Eldest son of Decimus Camillus Verus
 Camillus Justinus - Youngest son of Decimus Camillus Verus
 Claudia Rufina - Heiress
 Decimus Camillus Verus - Senator and father of Helena Justina
 Famia - Maia's husband
 Helena Justina - Wife of Falco, and daughter of the Senator Decimus Camillus Verus
 Junilla Tacita - Mother of Falco
 Lenia - Laundress
 Maia - Falco's sister
 Marcus Didius Falco - Informer and Imperial Agent.
 Smaractus - Husband of Lenia
 Thalia - Circus manager

Romans 
 Antonia Caenis - Mistress of Vespasian
 Buxus - Animal Keeper
 Claudius Laeta - Senior Palace Administrator
 Pomponius Urtica - Praetor
 Rumex - Gladiator
 Rutilius Gallicus - Special envoy to Tripolitania
 Scilla 
 Vespasian Augustus - Emperor of Rome

Tripolitanians 
 Artemisia - Wife of Calliopus
 Calliopus - Venatio specialist from Oea
 Euphrasia - Wife of Saturninus
 Fidelis - Interpreter
 Hanno - From Sabratha
 Iddibal - Bestiarus
 Myrrha - Punic
 Saturninus - Gladiator's trainer from Lepcis Magna

Awards and nominations
 Winner of the first Ellis Peters Historical Dagger awarded by the Crime Writers' Association in 1999.

Release details
 1998, UK, Century Hardback 
 1999, UK, Arrow, Paperback 
 1999, UK, Isis, Audio,  (read by Christopher Scott)
 1999, US, Mysterious Press, Hardback 
 2000, US, Mysterious Press, Paperback

References

External links 
lindseydavis.co.uk Author's Official Website

1998 British novels
Marcus Didius Falco novels
Historical crime novels
73
74
Century (imprint) books